The Germany national futsal team represents Germany during international futsal competitions such as the FIFA Futsal World Cup and the European Championships.  The German Football Association decided the foundation of a national team on 4 December 2015 within the context of a so-called Futsal Masterplan in order to participate in the qualification for the UEFA Futsal Euro 2018. Germany achieved their first international victory at Hamburg's 2,092-capacity Inselpark on 30 October 2016 in a friendly against England, which ended 5–3. Germany then played the qualification for the UEFA Futsal Euro 2018 but were eliminated in the preliminary round, finishing in third place in their qualifying group C with four points, above Estonia and behind group winners Latvia and Armenia.

Tournament records

FIFA Futsal World Cup

UEFA Futsal Championship

All match results
 As of 1 January 2020

References

External links
German national futsal team on DFB.de
Results and tables of all German futsal leagues

European national futsal teams
Futsal
National